The Lone Star Vigilantes is a 1942 American Western film directed by Wallace Fox and written by Luci Ward. The film stars Wild Bill Elliott, Tex Ritter, Frank Mitchell, Virginia Carpenter, Luana Walters and Budd Buster. The film was released on January 1, 1942, by Columbia Pictures.

Plot

Cast          
Wild Bill Elliott as Wild Bill Hickok
Tex Ritter as Tex Martin
Frank Mitchell as Cannonball 
Virginia Carpenter as Sherry Monroe
Luana Walters as Marcia Banning
Budd Buster as Colonel Sam Monroe
Forrest Taylor as Dr. Mark Banning
Gavin Gordon as Major Halland Clark
Lowell Drew as Peabody
Edmund Cobb as Sergeant Charley Cobb
Ethan Laidlaw as Corporal Benson
Rick Anderson as Lige Miller

References

External links
 

1942 films
American Western (genre) films
1942 Western (genre) films
Columbia Pictures films
Films directed by Wallace Fox
American black-and-white films
1940s English-language films
1940s American films